The men's 4 x 100 m surface relay event in finswimming at the 2009 World Games took place on 24 July 2009 at the Kaohsiung Swimming Pool in Kaohsiung, Taiwan.

Competition format
A total of 8 teams entered the competition. Only final was held.

Results

References

External links
 Results on IWGA website

Finswimming at the 2009 World Games